Mezali is a village in the Sagaing Region, Myanmar.

Mezali may also refer to:

Places
 Mezali, Kayin State, a village in Kayin State, Myanmar

People
 Fodil Mezali, an Algerian journalist and writer
 Hocine Mezali, an Algerian journalist and writer

Arabic-language surnames
People from Boumerdès Province